Killian Phillips (born 30 March 2002) is an Irish footballer who plays as a midfielder for  club Shrewsbury Town on loan from  club Crystal Palace.

Early life
Phillips was born in San Diego on 30 March 2002 and moved to Kilbarrack, Dublin as a child. He began his football career as a youth player with Kilbarrack United before moving to Drogheda United.

Career
Having been a non-playing substitute in some matches in 2020, Phillips made his debut for Drogheda in April 2021 and played 31 times during the 2021 season. At the end of the season, he had a trial with Crystal Palace and made a permanent move to the Premier League club in January 2022, and spent the rest of the 2021–22 season with the club's under-23 team. In March 2022, he was selected for the Republic of Ireland under-21 squad, but was only involved as a non-playing substitute. He was part of the Crystal Palace first-team squad that travelled to Singapore and Australia before the 2022–23 season and started in the friendly games against Liverpool and Manchester United.
Phillips made his senior debut for Crystal Palace on 23 August 2022, starting the Carabao Cup tie against Oxford United.

On 29 December 2022, it was announced that Phillips would join Shrewsbury Town on loan until the end of the season, once the transfer window opened on 1 January 2023.

Career statistics

References

External links 

2002 births
Living people
Association footballers from Dublin (city)
Association football midfielders
Republic of Ireland association footballers
American soccer players
American people of Irish descent
Crystal Palace F.C. players
Drogheda United F.C. players
League of Ireland players
Shrewsbury Town F.C. players